The 13th Chess Olympiad, organized by FIDE and comprising an open team tournament, as well as several other events designed to promote the game of chess, took place between September 30 and October 23, 1958, in Munich, West Germany.

The Soviet team with 6 GMs, led by world champion Botvinnik, lived up to expectations and won their fourth gold medals in a row, with Yugoslavia and Argentina taking the silver and bronze, respectively. The West German hosts finished 7th, right behind rivals East Germany. The two neighbouring nations were tied on both game and match points, but the East Germans had won the match between the two.

Results

Preliminaries

A total of 36 teams entered the competition and were divided into four preliminary groups of nine teams each. The top three from each group advanced to Final A, the teams placed 4th–6th to Final B, and no. 7–9 to Final C. All groups and finals were played as round-robin tournaments.

Group 1 was won by the Soviet hosts, well ahead of Bulgaria and Austria. The Netherlands, Denmark, and France took the places 4–6, while Italy, Puerto Rico, and Ireland finished at the bottom of the group.

Spain caused a small surprise by taking first place in group 2, ahead of the resurrected US team and the host nation. Finland, Iceland, and Israel made up the middle part of the group, while Norway, South Africa, and Iran had to settle for the bottom.

Group 3 was won by Argentina, ahead of East Germany and England. Traditional chess power Hungary surprisingly had to settle for Final B, along with Poland and Colombia. Meanwhile, The Philippines, Scotland, and Lebanon finished at the bottom of the group.

Czechoslovakia clinched group 4, ahead of Yugoslavia and Switzerland. Canada, Sweden, and Belgium made up the middle part of the group, while Portugal, Tunisia, and Greece completed the field.

 Group 1: 

 Group 2:

 Group 3:

 Group 4:

Final

{| class="wikitable"
|+ Final A
! # !!Country !! Players !! Points !! MP !! HTH
|-
| style="background:gold;"|1 ||  || Botvinnik, Smyslov, Keres, Bronstein, Tal, Petrosian || 34½ ||  || 
|-
| style="background:silver;"|2 ||  || Gligorić, Matanović, Ivkov, Trifunović, Đurašević, Fuderer || 29 ||  || 
|-
| style="background:#cc9966;"|3 ||  || Pilnik, Panno, Eliskases, Redolfi, Sanguineti, Emma || 25½ ||  || 
|-
| 4 ||  || Reshevsky, Lombardy, Bisguier, Evans, Rossolimo || 24 ||  || 
|-
| 5 ||  || Pachman, Filip, Fichtl, Kozma, Rejfíř, Šefc || 22 || 12 || 
|-
| 6 ||  || Uhlmann, Malich, Dittmann, Bertholdt, Fuchs, Pietzsch || 22 || 11 || 3½
|-
| 7 ||  || Unzicker, Tröger, Schmid, Darga, Pfeiffer, Lehmann || 22 || 11 || ½
|-
| 8 ||  || Kupper, Blau, Keller, Walther, Nievergelt, Bhend || 19 ||  || 
|-
| 9 ||  || Pomar, Pérez, Torán Albero, Farre, Albareda, Lladó Lumbera || 17½ ||  || 
|-
| 10 ||   || Neikirch, Bobotsov, Minev, Milev, Tringov, Padevsky || 17 ||  || 
|-
| 11 ||  || Alexander, Penrose, Golombek, Clarke, Wade || 16 ||  || 
|-
| 12 ||  || Dückstein, Prameshuber, Stöckl, Beni, Lokvenc || 15½ ||  || 
|-
|}

{| class="wikitable"
|+ Final B
! # !! Country !! Players !! Points !! MP
|-
| 13 ||  || Szabó, Barcza, Portisch, Bilek, Honfi, Forintos || 31 || 
|-
| 14 ||  || Euwe, Donner, Prins, van den Berg, Kramer, Roessel || 28 || 
|-
| 15 ||  || Yanofsky, Anderson, Vaitonis, Füster, Joyner, Siemms || 24½ || 17
|-
| 16 ||   || Cuéllar, Sánchez, de Greiff, Martín || 24½ || 13
|-
| 17 ||   || Porat, Czerniak, Aloni, Smiltiner, Pilshchik, Kraidman || 23½ || 
|-
| 18 ||   || Larsen, Andersen, Enevoldsen J., Pedersen, Ravn, Enevoldsen H. || 23 || 
|-
| 19 ||   || Śliwa, Tarnowski, Szukszta, Witkowski, Kostro, Brzózka || 22½ || 
|-
| 20 ||   || Ståhlberg, Johansson, Sterner, Nilsson, Arnlind, Hörberg || 21 || 
|-
| 21 ||   || Ojanen, Böök, Rantanen, Fred, Koskinen, Hällström || 19 || 
|-
| 22 ||   || Jóhannsson, Pálmason, Thorbergsson, Jónsson, Guðmundsson, Kristjánsson || 18 || 
|-
| 23 ||   || Raizman, Boutteville, Bergraser, Lemoine, Catozzi, Noradounguian || 15 || 
|-
| 24 ||   || Dunkelblum, Franck, Van Schoor, Van den Broeck, Beyen, Weltjens || 13½ || 
|}

{| class="wikitable"
|+ Final C
! # !! Country !! Players !! Points !! MP !! HTH
|-
| 25 ||  || Rojahn, Vestøl, Ofstad, Bøckman, Lindblom, Halvorsen || 30 ||  || 
|-
| 26 ||  || Cardoso, Campomanes, Borja, Aldecoa || 29½ ||  || 
|-
| 27 ||  || Heidenfeld, Dreyer, Kirby, Grivainis, Isaacson, Stern || 28 ||  || 
|-
| 28 ||  || Primavera, Romani, Norcia, Palmiotto, Laco, Contedini || 26½ ||  || 
|-
| 29 ||  || Fairhurst, Aitken, Macleod, Perkins, Beckingham E., Thomson || 25½ ||  || 
|-
| 30 ||  || Syngellakis, Angos, Panagopoulos, Sakellaropoulos, Anastasopoulos, Zografakis || 25 ||  || 
|-
| 31 ||  || Durão, Oliveira, Ribeiro, Gonçalves, Pereira, Cardoso || 23 ||  || 
|-
| 32 ||  || Safvat, Mashian, Pakdaman, Lotfy, Navabi, Assar || 20 ||  || 
|-
| 33 ||  || Cintrón, Benítez, Reissmann, Llavandero, Azúar, Vissepó || 14½ || 4 || 2½
|-
| 34 ||  || Walsh, Reilly, Canton B., Loughrey, Russell A., Reid || 14½ || 4 || 1½
|-
| 35 ||  || Lagha, Harrouchi, Kchouk, Ennigrou, Mohsen || 14 ||  || 
|-
| 36 ||  || Chalabi, Gabriel, Tarazi, Allam, Succar || 13½ ||  || 
|}

Final A

Final B

Final C

Individual medals

 Board 1:  Svetozar Gligorić 12 / 15 = 80.0%
 Board 2:  Frank Anderson 10½ / 13 = 80.8%
 Board 3:  Paul Keres 9½ / 12 = 79.2%
 Board 4:  David Bronstein 9½ / 12 = 79.2%
 1st reserve:  Mikhail Tal 13½ / 15 = 90.0%
 2nd reserve:  Tigran Petrosian and  Győző Forintos 10½ / 13 = 80.8%

References

13th Chess Olympiad: Munich 1958 OlimpBase

13
Olympiad 13
Chess Olympiad 13
Olympiad 13
Chess Olympiad 13
1950s in Munich
Chess in West Germany
October 1958 sports events in Europe